This is the family tree for monarchs of England (and Wales after 1282) from Alfred the Great to Elizabeth I of England. The House of Wessex family tree precedes this family tree and the family tree of the British royal family follows it.

As to the medieval histories of Scotland and Wales:
The family tree of Scottish monarchs covers the same period in Scotland and, equally as shown, directly precedes the family tree of the British royal family.
The family tree of Welsh monarchs is relevant before the 1282 conquest by England.

For a simplified family tree see family tree of British monarchs (and alternative successions of the English and British crown for unsuccessful claimants' family trees).

Key
  : The red border (bold or thin) indicates monarchs
 : The bold black border indicates children of monarchs
 : The thin black border indicates other relatives

Houses of Wessex, Knýtlinga and Godwinson

Houses of Normandy and Blois

House of Plantagenet

Houses of Lancaster and York

House of Tudor

See also
 History of monarchy in the United Kingdom
 Lists of monarchs in the British Isles
 Simplified English and British monarchs family tree

Notes

References
 
 
 

Family trees
Family tree
Dynasty genealogy
Monarchs